Elophila occidentalis is a moth in the family Crambidae. It was described by William Harry Lange in 1956. It is found in the United States, where it has been recorded from California, Arizona and Nebraska.

The wingspan is 11–15 mm for males and 15–22 mm for females. The forewings are fuscous with rufous-and-white markings. The hindwings are fuscous with a reddish area at the base. Adults have been recorded on wing from June to September in two to three generations per year.

The larvae feed on Echinodorus cordifolius, Bacopa rotundifolia, Potamogeton gramineus, Sigittaria species, Typha californica and Jussiaea californica. Young larvae cut a small peace of a leaf of their host plant and shelter beneath this while feeding on the leaf. Older larvae create a case. Young larvae are white, but turn pale green when growing older. Full-grown larvae reach a length of about 16 mm. Pupation takes place in a silken cocoon made inside the case.

References

Acentropinae
Moths described in 1956
Moths of North America
Aquatic insects